C-methylated flavonoids are a category of flavonoid having methylation(s) on carbon. An example of such compounds is the flavanone poriol.

See also
 O-methylated flavonoid

Flavonoids